The list of parties to weapons of mass destruction treaties encompasses the states which have signed and ratified, succeeded, or acceded to any of the major multilateral treaties prohibiting or restricting weapons of mass destruction (WMD), in particular nuclear, biological, or chemical weapons.

Overview

List of states parties to weapons of mass destruction treaties 
The following list was last updated in March 2021.

Legend:

 GP = Geneva Protocol
 BWC = Biological Weapons Convention
 CWC = Chemical Weapons Convention
 NPT = Nuclear Non-Proliferation Treaty
 TPNW = Treaty on the Prohibition of Nuclear Weapons
 CTBT = Comprehensive Nuclear-Test-Ban Treaty

 S = signing; R = ratification; A = accession; Su = succession; Ac = acceptance

 Notes

See also 

 List of parties to the Biological Weapons Convention
 List of parties to the Chemical Weapons Convention
 List of parties to the Comprehensive Nuclear-Test-Ban Treaty
 List of parties to the Treaty on the Non-Proliferation of Nuclear Weapons
 List of parties to the Treaty on the Prohibition of Nuclear Weapons
 List of parties to the Partial Nuclear Test Ban Treaty

References 

WMD treaty parties
WMD treaty parties
WMD treaty parties
WMD treaty parties
WMD treaty parties